The following is a list of notable events and releases of the year 1975 in Norwegian music.

Events

March
 21 – The 2nd Vossajazz started in Voss, Norway (March 21 – 23).

May
 21
 The 23rd Bergen International Festival started in Bergen, Norway (May 21 – June 4).
 The 3rd Nattjazz started in Bergen, Norway (May 21 – June 4).

June
 22 – The 6th Kalvøyafestivalen started at Kalvøya near by Oslo.

Albums released

Unknown date

A
 Arild Andersen
 Clouds in My Head (ECM Records).

B
 Odd Børretzen
 Odd Børretzen (Camp Records)

E
 Jan Eggum
 Jan Eggum (CBS Records)

K
 Karin Krog
 Jazz Jamboree 75 Vol. 2 (Polydor Records) with Zbigniew Namysłowski Quintet.

N
 Lillebjørn Nilsen
 Byen Med Det Store Hjertet (Polydor Records)

P
 Popol Ace
 Stolen From Time (Polydor Records)

R
 Inger Lise Rypdal
 Feeling (Talent Records)
 Terje Rypdal
 Odyssey (ECM Records).

S
 Torgrim Sollid
 Østerdalsmusikk (Plateselskapet MAI)
 Øystein Sunde
 Hurtbuller I Hvit Saus (Philips Records)

Deaths

 August
 24 – Brita Bratland, traditional folk singer (born 1910).

 November
 30 – Paul Okkenhaug, composer and organist (born 1908).

Births

 January
 13 – Rune Eriksen, black metal guitarist and composer, Mayhem.

March
 4 – Mats Eilertsen, jazz upright bassist and composer.
 9 – Øyvind Storesund, rock and jazz upright bassist, Cloroform and Kaizers Orchestra.
 10 – Håvard Wiik, jazz pianist and composer, Atomic.
 18 – Sondre Meisfjord, jazz bassist and cellist, and composer.
 22 – Steinar Raknes, jazz upright bassist and composer.

 April
 9 – Bertine Zetlitz, pop singer.
 12 – Lars Andreas Haug, jazz tubist and composer.
 14 – Øystein Brun, black metal guitarist, Borknagar.
 23
 Helge Lien, jazz pianist, composer and band leader.
 Rolf-Erik Nystrøm, saxophonist and composer.

 May
 1 – Aslak Hartberg, rapper and bass player.
 2 – Alexander Stenerud, singer/songwriter.
 15 – Frode Haltli, accordion player
 19 – Geir Zahl, rock guitarist, Kaizers Orchestra.
 20 – Bjarte Ludvigsen, drummer and record producer.

 June
 2 – Gisle Torvik, jazz guitarist and composer.
 16 – Jannike Kruse, singer, artist and actor.

 July
 22 – Erik Johannessen, trombonist and composer.
 28 – John Erik Kaada, singer-songwriter, producer and multi-instrumentalist.

August
 1 – Håkon Mjåset Johansen, jazz drummer and composer.
 2 – Lars Petter Hagen, contemporary composer and director of the Ultima Oslo Contemporary Music Festival.
 7 – Kristian Eivind "Gaahl" Espedal, black metal vocalist and artist, God Seed, Wardruna, and Gaahls Wyrd).
 12 – Robert Burås, vocalist, guitarist and songwriter, Madrugada and My Midnight Creeps, (died 2007).
 27 – Janove Ottesen, rock  vocalist, guitarist, and playing on barrels, Kaizers Orchestra.

 September
 15 – Andy LaPlegua, lead vocalist (Icon of Coil).
 16 – Thomas "Pest" Kronenes, black metal vocalist (Gorgoroth).
 26 – Håvard Jørgensen, songwriter, guitarist and vocalist (Satyricon and Ulver).

 October
 2 – Kåre Opheim, drummer (Real Ones).
 10 – Vegard Sverre Tveitan, black metal vocalist, multi-instrumentalist, and composer (Emperor).
 12
 Espen Aalberg, jazz drummer.
 Marianne Beate Kielland, Norwegian mezzo-soprano.
 25 – Eirik Glambek Bøe, musician, writer and vocalist (Kings of Convenience).
 26 – Ole Marius Sandberg, jazz upright bassist.
 27 – Kate Havnevik, film score composer, songwriter and singer.

 November
 12 – Simen Eriksrud, songwriter and record producer.
 20
 Lars K. Hustoft, songwriter, record producer and artist manager.
 Sigurd Wongraven, black metal vocalist, guitarist, bassist, and keyboardist (Satyricon).
 21 – Erlend Øye, composer, musician, producer, singer and songwriter.
 27 – Frode Nymo, jazz saxophonist.

 Unknown date
 Ernst Simon Glaser, cellist and music teacher.
 Kolbjørn Lyslo, DJ, musician, and music producer.

See also
 1975 in Norway
 Music of Norway
 Norway in the Eurovision Song Contest 1975

References

 
Norwegian music
Norwegian
Music
1970s in Norwegian music